Vasillaq Vangjeli (February 19, 1948 – September 26, 2011) was an Albanian actor and comedian, known for his role as Koçi in The Lady from the Town.

1948 births
2011 deaths
Albanian male actors